Michel Meerz (15 February 1890 – 15 April 1963) was a French athlete. He competed in the men's high jump at the 1912 Summer Olympics.

References

1890 births
1963 deaths
Athletes (track and field) at the 1912 Summer Olympics
French male high jumpers
Olympic athletes of France
Place of birth missing